Denis Coderre  (born July 25, 1963) is a Canadian politician from Quebec. Coderre was the member of Parliament for the riding of Bourassa from 1997 until 2013, and was the Immigration minister from 2002 to 2003 and became the mayor of Montreal in 2013, but lost in 2017 to Valérie Plante. In 2021, he was defeated once again by Valérie Plante after a second mayoral race. He has been an administrator of Eurostar since 2018 and special advisor for the FIA since 2019.

Background 
Born in Joliette, Quebec, Coderre is the son of Elphege Coderre, a carpenter, and Lucie Baillargeon. The family moved to Montréal-Nord in 1973, where Coderre attended École Secondaire Henri-Bourassa and Cégep Marie-Victorin. He has a BA in political science from the Université de Montréal and a Master in Business Administration (MBA) from the University of Ottawa.

Federal politics

Unsuccessful Liberal candidate 
Coderre ran unsuccessfully three times prior to being elected: first, in the 1988 election in the riding of Joliette, losing to the Progressive Conservative Party candidate, Gaby Larrivée; second, in a 1990 by-election in the riding of Laurier—Sainte-Marie, losing to Gilles Duceppe; and third, in the 1993 elections in the riding of Bourassa, defeated by the Bloc Québécois candidate, Osvaldo Núñez.

Member of Parliament 
Coderre was elected as a Member of Parliament in 1997 representing the riding of Bourassa, located in Montreal, and was re-elected in the 2000, 2004, 2006, 2008, and 2011 federal elections. In August 1999 he was appointed Secretary of State for Amateur Sport.

Cabinet Member 
In January 2002, he was appointed Immigration minister.

On December 12, 2003, Prime Minister Paul Martin advised Governor General Adrienne Clarkson to appoint Coderre to the Cabinet as President of the Queen's Privy Council for Canada where he was responsible for a number of files, such as the creation of the new Public Service Human Resources Management Agency. He was also the Federal Interlocutor for Metis and Non-Status Indians, the Minister responsible for La Francophonie and the Minister responsible for the Office of Indian Residential Schools Resolution. Coderre was not re-appointed to Cabinet following the 2004 general election, despite being re-elected in his riding.

As Minister of Immigration, Coderre supervised the application of the Immigration and Refugee Protection Act, which came into effect on June 28, 2002. As Secretary of State for Amateur Sport, Coderre successfully negotiated a number of national and international agreements and helped to establish the World Anti-Doping Agency in Montreal.

Adil Charkaoui 
As minister of Immigration, Coderre was responsible, along with his cabinet colleague Wayne Easter, for the detention of Adil Charkaoui, a Moroccan immigrant with a checkered travel history, on a security certificate.  Restrictions on Charkaoui's conditional release were gradually lifted, and were cancelled in September 2009, on his final release order by Federal Court Judge Danièle Tremblay-Lamer.

Sponsorship scandal 
During the events of the Sponsorship Scandal Denis Coderre was accused of frequent confidential conversations with Pierre Tremblay, head of the Communications Coordination Services Branch of Public Works.  Coderre has denied these allegations.  His previous position as vice-president of public affairs for Le Groupe Polygone Éditeurs Inc. is judged to be the key connecting factor.
 Close links to Claude Boulay of Groupe Everest, another actor in the sponsorship scandal, were also made during the Gomery Inquiry, which cost him his cabinet position in 2004. No legal action has been taken to substantiate or disprove the allegations.

The Shane Doan incident 
During the 2006 election, Coderre accused National Hockey League player Shane Doan of uttering ethnic slurs directed against French-speaking referees at a game in Montreal. Coderre wrote a letter to the Canadian Olympic Committee asking them to keep Doan off Canada's 2006 hockey team competing at the Olympics in Turin, Italy. The Globe and Mail columnist Eric Duhatschek noted that "the NHL is tough on ethnic slurs ... if Mr. Coderre has any proof he should produce it. Otherwise he should just shut up." Hockey commentator John Davidson accused Coderre of "grandstanding" and criticized his accusation, saying that "a person shouldn't go stand on a platform and yell and scream about it when he doesn't even know the facts."

Doan was given a gross misconduct penalty for verbal abuse of the officials at the end of the December 13, 2005 game between his team, the Phoenix Coyotes, and the Montreal Canadiens. Referees and linesmen for the game were all francophones from Quebec. Although one of the linesmen, Michel Cormier, filed a report against the player, Doan was cleared by NHL Executive Vice-President Colin Campbell, the league's chief disciplinarian, who concluded that the allegations were baseless. Doan himself has denied that he ever made the ethnic slur.

In January 2006, Doan sued Coderre for character defamation seeking $250,000 in damages with Doan promising to donate all damages awarded to charities to benefit Canadians. On April 2, 2007 Coderre counter-sued Doan for defamation seeking $45,000 in damages after referee Michel Cormier reiterated under oath that Doan made a racist comment against him as a Francophone.

Opposition Member 
Coderre won re-election to the House of Commons in 2006, but the Liberals lost the campaign and became the Official Opposition party. Coderre was the Liberal Defence Critic. In 2007 Coderre made allegations against the previous Chief of Defence Staff General Rick Hillier (retired) of being a "prop".  Hillier in return has accused Coderre of being more concerned with party image than in protecting Canadian Forces members. In October 2007, Coderre made a self-planned visit to Afghanistan to visit the war-torn country and the Canadian Forces in the Kandahar region. He criticized the Harper government — who did not invite him on an official tour of the country that was made by Ministers Bev Oda and Maxime Bernier a few days before him — and consequently, Coderre, as Liberal defense critic, had to travel by himself at his own expense, mentioned that the mission in Afghanistan must change in 2009. The government had accused him of staging a stunt while he fired back that the Conservatives overestimated the success of the mission.

Quebec lieutenant 
On January 22, 2009, Coderre became the Quebec lieutenant of Liberal Leader Michael Ignatieff.  He had been offered the same assignment by former leader Stéphane Dion, but had declined the offer.

On September 28, 2009, Coderre resigned as Quebec lieutenant because of a disagreement with Ignatieff.  Coderre had been tasked with picking 'star candidates' for the next election, attempting to replace Montreal-area MPs Stéphane Dion, Lise Zarac, and Bernard Patry, as well as Laval MP Raymonde Folco, at Ignatieff's request. Coderre had chosen Nathalie Le Prohon to run in Outremont, formerly a Liberal safe seat now held by the NDP's Thomas Mulcair. However, Martin Cauchon was seeking a return to politics and wanted to run in Outremont, a riding he had held for 11 years prior to 2004 when then-Liberal leader Paul Martin would not guarantee Cauchon's nomination. Cauchon had served as Jean Chrétien's Minister of Justice and Quebec lieutenant. Cauchon preferred to seek help from Alfred Apps from Toronto instead of talking to Coderre and his team. Cauchon and Coderre had previously been close when both were part of Chrétien's cabinet, but some suggest that Coderre now saw Cauchon as a potential rival for influence over the Quebec wing of the Liberals, and perhaps in a future leadership convention. Ignatieff initially sided with Coderre, then reversed his decision and allowed Cauchon to run in Outremont.

In Coderre's first press conference after resigning as Quebec lieutenant, he criticized Ignatieff's aides, all of whom were from Toronto. Coderre also skipped votes in the House of Commons in protest. Ignatieff later warned that Coderre would face expulsion from caucus if he did "any more damage to the party."

In 2012, Coderre confirmed that he would not run for the leadership of the federal Liberal Party.

Mayoralty

2013 election 
Coderre resigned on June 2, 2013 to run for mayor of Montreal in the 2013 Montreal municipal election. He formed the Montreal municipal party Équipe Denis Coderre pour Montréal (alternatively Équipe Denis Coderre) though he had no previous provincial or municipal experience. Coderre was elected mayor of Montreal subsequent to the municipal elections of November 3, 2013.

Spending of $410 million for Montréal's 375th anniversary in 2017 
The Montreal government of Coderre contributed $ 410 million for events and projects for Montreal's 375th anniversary, in 2017.   The figure of 410 million means $ 241 per person in Montreal (population 1.7 million).  The total spending for the festivities exceeded $ 1 billion.  The rest came from Quebec, Ottawa and private sources.     For Montreal's contribution, the main achievements that remain include several sculptures in various parts of Montreal; and some other beautification projects.  In addition, the Société des célébrations du 375e anniversaire de Montréal, to which Montreal was a major contributor, paid $9.5 million out of the total price of $ 40 million for the controversial light project of the Jacques-Cartier Bridge.   Some have found that the costs of the celebrations have not been worth the benefits.

2017 election 
Coderre ran for re-election in the 2017 Montreal municipal election on November 5, 2017. In a surprise, Coderre lost the mayoral race to Valérie Plante, making her the first female elected Mayor for the city of Montréal. After the election loss, he announced that he would be retiring from politics.

2021 election 
After much speculation, Coderre had announced his intention to run for Mayor of Montreal in the 2021 Montreal municipal election. On April 7, 2021 he became leader of the municipal party Ensemble Montréal (formerly Équipe Denis Coderre).  On November 7, 2021, he was defeated once again by Valérie Plante. After the election loss, he announced once again that he would be retiring from politics.

Political stance

Lawsuit by Hamza Chaoui 
On January 31, 2015, the Coderre administration denied a request to open an Islamic community centre in the Mercier-Hochelaga-Maisonneuve neighbourhood of Montreal because its imam Hamza Chaoui, had allegedly preached that Canadians ought to change their legal system to sharia. Chaoui filed a lawsuit on July 9 for defamation against Coderre and the city of Montreal. Chaoui characterised Coderre's remarks as an attack on his dignity, honour and reputation. Réal Ménard, the borough mayor of Mercier-Hochelaga-Maisonneuve, supported Coderre's position.

Coderre jackhammer vs. mailbox stunt 
In August 2015, Coderre took a jackhammer to a Canada Post community mailbox foundation in l'Anse-à-l'Orme Nature Park.  He was dismissive of concerns that his action was illegal. The Province of Quebec's Crown prosecutors office confirmed that Coderre would not face charges for the media stunt.

Environmental issues 
From October 18, 2015 until October 25, 2015, Coderre authorized the dumping for 8 billion litres of untreated sewage into the Saint Lawrence River to facilitate repairs to Montreal's sewer system. The incident was widely criticized by Environment and Climate Change Canada, Infrastructure Canada, and a petition of over 55,000 signatures.

On January 21, 2016, Coderre, along with other officials of the Montreal Metropolitan Community (Communauté Métropolitaine de Montréal), formally opposed the Energy East Pipeline project based on environmental concerns. His position was denounced by Conservative Party of Canada interim leader Rona Ambrose, Saskatchewan Party leader Brad Wall and Alberta Wildrose Party leader Brian Jean.

Pit bull ban 
On September 27, 2016, Montreal passed a citywide pit bull ban. Coderre was a big advocate for the bylaw stating that "My duty as mayor of Montreal is making sure I am working for all Montrealers, and I am there to make sure they feel safe and that they are safe." The bylaw creates a citywide ban on new pit bull-type dogs from being owned and restrictions on those currently in the city. The bylaw also places new restrictions on all dogs and cats within the city and its 19 boroughs, which has led to a lot of controversy. Animal protection groups such as the Montreal SPCA (Society for the Prevention of Cruelty to Animals) stated that if the new bylaw passed they would take legal action against the city.

On October 3, 2016, a Quebec judge temporarily suspended the pit bull ban part of the bylaw. Two days later the judge decided to extend the suspension on the grounds that the bylaw was too vague and imprecise, claiming that "This court has the impression that certain articles of the bylaw were written in haste." An appeal court overturned the decision and Coderre's pit bull ban was in effect in Montreal from December 1, 2016 to December 20, 2017, when the administration of new mayor Valérie Plante repealed it in favor of a new animal by-law that didn't target specific breeds. Opposition to Coderre's pit bull ban was an electoral issue during the 2017 Montreal municipal election.

Honours

References

External links 
 

1963 births
Liberal Party of Canada MPs
Living people
Mayors of Montreal
Members of the House of Commons of Canada from Quebec
People from Joliette
People from Montréal-Nord
Université de Montréal alumni
University of Ottawa alumni
Quebec people of Irish descent
Members of the 26th Canadian Ministry
Members of the 27th Canadian Ministry